DFF or D.F.F. may refer to:

 D.F.F., a 2002 extended play, a by extreme metal and stoner rock band Blood Duster
 Danish Council for Independent Research (Det Frie Forskningsråd), a Danish governmental body
 Deutscher Fernsehfunk, the state television broadcaster in the German Democratic Republic
 Digital Forensics Framework, computer forensics open-source software
 Digital Freedom Foundation, a non-profit organisation that acts as the official organiser of Software, Hardware, and other Freedom Days
 Directorate of Film Festivals, an Indian government organisation that organises the International Film Festival of India and other ceremonies
 Disposable Film Festival, an annual juried international festival of short films
 D flip-flop (or data flip-flop), an electronic primitive component useful for implementing computer memory